Dana Lofland Dormann (born September 16, 1967) is an American professional golfer who played on the LPGA Tour. She also played under her maiden name Dana Lofland and as Dana Lofland-Dormann.

Lofland won the 1985 U.S. Girls' Junior and the 1985 Junior World Golf Championships (Girls 15–17).

Dormann won twice on the LPGA Tour in 1992 and 1993.

Dormann is the assistant head coach of the San Jose State University's woman's golf team and her husband John is the head coach. She is also a teaching pro at the Pleasanton Golf Center in Pleasanton, California.

Professional wins (2)

LPGA Tour wins (2)

LPGA Tour playoff record (0–1)

Team appearances
Amateur
Curtis Cup (representing the United States): 1984 (winners)

References

External links

American female golfers
San Jose State Spartans women's golfers
San Jose State Spartans coaches
LPGA Tour golfers
College golf coaches in the United States
Golfers from California
Sportspeople from Oxnard, California
People from Pleasanton, California
Sportspeople from Ventura County, California
1967 births
Living people